The Ballad of Sexual Dependency is a 1985 slide show exhibition and 1986 artist's book publication of photographs taken between 1979 and 1986 by photographer Nan Goldin. It is an autobiographical document of a portion of New York City's No wave music and art scene, the post-Stonewall gay subculture of the late 1970s and early 1980s, the heroin subculture of the Bowery neighborhood, and Goldin's personal family and love life.

Critic Sean O'Hagan, writing in The Guardian in 2014, said it "remains a benchmark for all other work in a similar confessional vein." Lucy Davies, writing in The Telegraph in 2014, said it "would come to influence a generation of fledgling photographers, who fell into her truth-telling wake. She was credited by Bill Clinton with inventing heroin chic".

Details
The title The Ballad of Sexual Dependency was adapted from a song in Bertolt Brecht's Threepenny Opera.

It was originally devised as a slideshow set to the music of Velvet Underground, James Brown, Nina Simone, Charles Aznavour, Screamin' Jay Hawkins and Petula Clark among others, to entertain Goldin's friends. It "portrayed her friends – many of them part of the hard-drugs subculture on New York's lower east side – as they partied, got high, fought and had sex. It was first publicly shown at the Whitney Biennial in New York in 1985 and was published as a photobook the following year."

The snapshot aesthetic book was first published with help from Marvin Heiferman, Mark Holborn, and Suzanne Fletcher in 1986.

Selected solo exhibitions
1985: The Ballad of Sexual Dependency, screening. Whitney Museum of American Art.
1987: The Ballad of Sexual Dependency, screening. Rencontres d'Arles, Arles, France.
1997: The Ballad of Sexual Dependency, exhibition and screening, Théâtre Antique. Rencontres d'Arles, Arles, France.
2009: The Ballad of Sexual Dependency, exhibition and screening, Guest of honour at Rencontres d'Arles, Arles, France.
2016: The Ballad of Sexual Dependency, exhibition and screening. Museum of Modern Art, New York.
2017: The Ballad of Sexual Dependency, exhibition and screening. Portland Museum of Art, Portland, Maine.
2019: NAN GOLDIN - The Ballad of Sexual Dependency, display and screening. Tate Modern, London.

Publications
The Ballad of Sexual Dependency.
New York, NY: Aperture, 1986. .
New York, NY: Aperture, 2012. Hardback . Paperback .

Collections
The Ballad of Sexual Dependency is held in the following permanent collection:
Tate, UK

External links
 The Guardian article

References

Culture of New York City
Artists' books
American art
1986 books
1980s photographs
Photographic collections and books
Nude photography
LGBT art in the United States